Jonathan D. Karl (born January 19, 1968) is an American political journalist and author. Karl has covered every major assignment in Washington, D.C., including the White House, Capitol Hill, the Pentagon, and the U.S. State Department, and has reported from more than 30 countries, covering U.S. politics, foreign policy, and the military.

Karl is the Chief Washington Correspondent for ABC News and co-anchor of This Week with George Stephanopoulos. Karl served as the Chief White House Correspondent for ABC News from December 2012 through the end of the Trump administration in January 2021.

He is the author of the 2020 book Front Row at the Trump Show and the 2021 book Betrayal: The Final Act of the Trump Show. Both books are New York Times bestsellers.

In 2021, Mediaite named Karl one of the top 10 "Most Influential in News Media."  The publication said, "Jonathan Karl covered many major stories this year as ABC News chief Washington correspondent, but it’s the  reporting he dished out in his bestseller — Betrayal: The Final Act of the Trump Show — and how that book propelled the news cycle for weeks that secured his spot so high up on this list."

Early life
Karl credits his passion for history and journalism to a time in his adolescent years when his family moved to South Dakota. While living in two adjoining motel rooms in Hill City, South Dakota, his mother and stepfather did an oral history project for the University of South Dakota, interviewing the men who worked to create Mount Rushmore. "I went along," Karl later recalled, "as my stepfather and my mom would interview these men, and hear about these experiences."

Karl graduated Phi Beta Kappa from Vassar College in 1990, where he was the editor-in-chief of the Vassar Spectator.

Career
Karl began his career as a researcher and reporter for The New Republic. In 1994, he became a reporter at the New York Post, where he covered New York City Hall. In 1996, he was hired to cover politics as a Generation X reporter at CNN and went on to become the network's Congressional Correspondent.

He joined ABC News in January 2003 as the Senior Foreign Affairs Correspondent covering the State Department. He first interviewed Donald Trump in 1994 for a New York Post article about Michael Jackson and Lisa Marie Presley's honeymoon at Trump Tower.

He worked for ABC News covering national political news, becoming the Senior National Security Correspondent in December 2005. In 2006, Karl earned an Emmy Award nomination for his coverage of the genocide in Darfur, Sudan.

Karl was named Chief White House Correspondent for ABC News in December 2012 and held that position through the end of the Trump administration in January 2021. He continues as ABC News' Chief Washington correspondent and co-anchor of This Week with George Stephanopoulos. Karl's writings have been published in The Wall Street Journal, The Atlantic, Vanity Fair, and other publications.

Although Karl is an ABC News correspondent, he has often appeared on MSNBC, CNN, and Fox News in his capacity as an author.

Controversies 
In May 2013, Karl was caught in a controversy when he wrote an article that claimed to quote directly from an email sent by a White House advisor. It was later revealed that the quote was inaccurately given to Karl by an unnamed source, and that he himself had never seen the email. Karl apologized for the error, and also for not having stated that the quote was from a detailed summary his source provided, rather than a direct quote from the email.

Books

The Right to Bear Arms: The Rise of America's New Militias 
Karl is the author of the 1995 book The Right to Bear Arms: The Rise of America's New Militias.

Front Row at the Trump Show 
In March 2020, his book Front Row at the Trump Show, written before the COVID-19 pandemic, was released. It debuted at number 3 on the April 19, 2020, New York Times Combined Print & E-Book Nonfiction best seller list and spent 5 weeks in the top 15.

The book was released in paperback with a new afterward in March 2021 and hit number 6 on the New York Times Paperback Nonfiction best seller list.

In a review on Goodreads, Chris Rosa wrote, "This is how you write a Trump book. Jonathan Karl avoids the common pitfalls of covering Trump: personalization, sensationalism, faux outrage and overstated self-regard. President Donald Trump is a tough subject for journalists because of the game he's playing, which creates a trap for the press into which they frequently dive headfirst. Not Karl. He gets it. With a solid mixture of serious-minded factuality and good-humored prose, Karl provides an accessible understanding of the strangest White House in U.S. history. He also explains, calmly and rationally, the dangers presented when our leaders disregard truth or challenge democratic norms for personal gain."

The New York Times review called it an account chronicling the first three years of Trump's presidency. "The book feels weightiest toward its end, when Karl addresses 'the president’s incessant telling of untruths' and Trump's dangerous relationship with the press. Unspooling a distressing private Oval Office meeting with the president on the matter, he concludes, 'I fear President Trump's war on truth may do lasting damage to American democracy.'"

The Washington Post review calls the book "chiefly a compilation of his encounters and interviews with Trump and members of his staff" with "far too much recounting, often in somewhat tedious detail, of Karl’s daily coverage of Trump." According to the reviewer, the account "lacks analysis of the larger issues Trump and his presidency represent," while acknowledging in the epilogue "that Trump is 'motivated only by an insatiable desire to promote himself, but his assault on truth is toxic and contagious.'"

A review in The Guardian states that the "well-organized and respectfully written" book "conveys the chaos and the characters that inhabit the president’s universe," including "his preternatural disregard for the truth – 'Trump was a serial exaggerator long before he ran for president' – and his curious soft spot for the Confederacy."

Betrayal: The Final Act of the Trump Show 
Karl's next book, Betrayal: The Final Act of the Trump Show, mostly covers the last year of the Trump administration and was released in November 2021. It debuted at number 3 on the December 5, 2021, New York Times Combined Print & E-Book Nonfiction best seller list and spent 3 weeks in the top 15.

The Washington Post book review said, "Karl's sobering, solid, account of Trump's last year in office sheds new light on how the man who lost the presidency nearly succeeded in overthrowing the 2020 election. Anyone who thinks that 'it can’t happen here,' ought to read this book."

In The Guardian, John S. Gardner wrote, "Jonathan Karl produced arguably the year’s most significant book in Betrayal, in which Trump cabinet members ‘paint a portrait of a wrath-filled president, untethered from reality, bent on revenge’."

Larry Sabato of the University of Virginia named Betrayal the number one political book of 2021, saying, "Betrayal broke a lot of news but the reason I chose it is because it makes all the points that people need to know about what Karl calls ‘the final act of The Trump Show’ and it is very well written."

An NPR review says, "The overarching theme of Betrayal is that the former president did not merely flirt with defying the 2020 election result, he focused on it obsessively and conducted a months-long campaign to make it possible. This effort began well before Election Day and continued well after the constitutional process had been completed and Trump's opponent had been elected and inaugurated as president." The review adds:  "As a longtime TV reporter, ABC News Chief Washington Correspondent Jonathan Karl brings an eye for life as presented on screen that is acutely appropriate for the Trump saga."

The New York Times review said the book "is less insightful about the Trump White House and more revealing of Karl's own gradual, extremely belated awareness that something in the White House might in fact be awry." Karl had complained in his 2020 book that "the mainstream media coverage of Donald Trump is relentlessly and exhaustively negative." He acknowledged in his new book that Trump's "lies turned deadly and shook the foundations of our democracy." The book gives an inside look at the Trump White House, including scoops on memos by aide John McEntee, "who went from carrying President Trump's bags to becoming the director of the Presidential Personnel Office — 'responsible for the hiring and firing of more than 4,000 political appointees across the federal government.'" In the messages, McEntee insisted that vice president Mike Pence "had the authority to overturn the results of the November election" and that defense secretary Mark Esper should be fired.

Karl released audio from his March 2021 Trump interview for the book in which Trump defended the "hang Mike Pence" chants of insurrectionists during the 2021 United States Capitol attack on January 6 as "understandable" since Pence had not overturned the 2020 election results as requested.

Awards
Karl twice received the Joan Shorenstein Barone Award for excellence in Washington, D.C.-based reporting — in 2010 and 2015, the 2013 Walter Cronkite Award for National Individual Achievement, an Emmy Award in 2009 for his coverage of the Presidential Inauguration of Barack Obama, and the National Press Foundation's Everett McKinley Dirksen Award in 2001.

In 2021, Karl received the Merriman Smith Memorial Award for Excellence in Presidential News Coverage for his reporting on Donald Trump's infection with COVID-19.

References

External links
 
 How Pete Peterson Made America Hate Generation X, Daily Intelligencer by Jonathan Chait, New York, October 8, 2012

1968 births
20th-century American journalists
21st-century American journalists
ABC News personalities
American male journalists
American political journalists
American television journalists
Living people
Vassar College alumni